East Elbia was an informal denotation for those parts of the German Reich until World War II that lay east of the river Elbe.

The region comprised the Prussian provinces of Brandenburg, the eastern parts of Saxony (Jerichower Land) and the Kingdom of Saxony (Upper Lusatia), Pomerania, Silesia, East Prussia, West Prussia and Posen (from 1922 Posen-West Prussia) as well as the states of Free State of Mecklenburg-Schwerin and Free State of Mecklenburg-Strelitz. The urban area of Berlin was not included.

East Elbia was noted for its historic manorialism and serfdom, as well as for political conservatism, combined with the predominantly Protestant confession of the local population. "East Elbian Junker" was a politically charged term used by leftist parties especially during the Weimar Republic (1918-1933), denoting especially the rich functionaries of the conservative, right-wing German National People's Party (DNVP) that fit the stereotype. Already during the time of the German Empire (1871-1918), these East Elbian Junkers had formed the monarchy's reactionary backbone.

History

The former social structure of this region with relatively large latifundia owned by landed gentry is a product of Ostsiedlung in the medieval era when Germanic settlers moved into the area of settlement of the Wends and other Slavic groups changing the ethnic makeup of Germania Slavica through assimilation, expulsion and immigration. Since most of former East Elbia is east of the Oder Neisse line the vast majority of its ethnic German population was subject to expulsion after World War II. In the German Democratic  Republic, which controlled the remainder of East Elbia after 1949 a land reform was initiated to collectivize agriculture and also with the explicit goal of eliminating the junker class. Attempts at restitution for expropriated property after 1990 have only been partially successful and have not led to a reestablishment of the erstwhile social structure, but the average size of agricultural estates formed from erstwhile Landwirtschaftliche Produktionsgenossenschaften (LPG) and  volkseigene Güter (VEG) is still much higher in the East than in the West of Germany where agriculture is still based mostly on small farms. Still, the term "East Elbia" has vanished from common use outside historical contexts and is usually glossed in texts aimed at a general audience.

See also
 Junker
 Agrarian conservatism in Germany

References
McNeill Eddie, Scott (2008) Landownership in Eastern Germany before the Great War : a quantitative analysis. Oxford Univ. Press. 

Historical regions in Germany
Social history of Germany